Paduka Sri Sultan Ataullah Muhammad Shah II ibni al-Marhum Sultan Dziaddin Mukarram Shah I (died 17 November 1698) was the 16th Sultan of Kedah. His reign was from 1688 to 1698. He became Regent for his aged father, 1682. He removed his capital to Kota Bukit Pinang.

On 23 March 2017, his tomb was believed to be found along with another 8 tombs by the Malaysian Historical Society on the river banks at Kampung Bukit Pinang, near Alor Setar.

References

External links
 List of Sultans of Kedah

1698 deaths
17th-century Sultans of Kedah